Joe Fields (born 1953) is an American football center and guard

Joseph or Joe Fields may also refer to: 

 Joe Fields (producer) (1929–2017), American record producer
 Joe Fields (safety) (born 1985), American football player
 Joseph Fields (1895–1966), American playwright

See also
 Joseph Field (1774–1807), American pioneer